Wooderson may refer to:

 Sydney Wooderson, an English middle-distance runner
 Wooderson, Queensland, a locality in the Gladstone Region, Queensland, Australia